One More Time is a 1986 memoir by comedian Carol Burnett. It was published by Random House and became a New York Times non-fiction bestseller.

Burnett spent her childhood in a Depression-scarred Hollywood neighborhood, where she lived in a dingy single-room apartment with her grandmother. The child of alcoholic parents - a mother who fantasized about success in Hollywood and a father who eventually was committed to a public sanatorium - she constantly daydreamed about a show business career while at the same time realizing the odds of achieving one were very much against her, until a mysterious benefactor financed her move to New York City. In this book, she presents a coming of age tale that's humorous, heartbreaking, and hopeful.

The book served as the basis for the play Hollywood Arms, which Burnett co-wrote with her daughter Carrie Hamilton.

References

External links
 Bookseller Amazon.com listing

1986 non-fiction books
Books by Carol Burnett
Carol Burnett
Memoirs set in Los Angeles
Show business memoirs